Penny Century is the debut studio album by Australian indie rock band The Clouds. The album was released in October 1991 and peaked at number 23 on the Australian ARIA Charts. Following a re-release, the album was certified gold in Australia in 1996.

Reception
In The Sell-In, Craig Mathieson said the album was, "proof not only that Clouds could last the distance but that they ability to render depth and mystery into an accessible structure. Obvious on first listenings was the crispness of the drums and the razor-sharp talons of Easton's guitar work. Clouds were not only assured but great fun."

Track listing

Charts

Certification

Personnel
Stuart Eadie – drums
David Easton – guitar
Jodi Phillis – guitar, vocals
Patricia Young – bass, vocals

Release history

References

1991 debut albums